Penglai, Peng Lai, or Peng-lai may refer to: 

Penglai, Shandong, a county-level city in Shandong, China
Penglai, Hainan, a town in Wenchang, Hainan, China
Penglai, Sichuan, a town in Daying County, Sichuan, China
Penglai, Fujian, a town in Anxi County, Fujian, China
Mount Penglai, the island for immortals in Chinese mythology
Penglai, a 2022 short film produced by Illumination

See also
Penglai Pagoda in Penglai City